Sinistron, released as Violent Soldier in Japan, is a horizontally scrolling shooter that was released for the TurboGrafx-16 in 1990.

Plot
The story differs partly depending on the PC-Engine and TurboGrafix-16 version.

PC-Engine: Earth astronomers observe a supernova many astronomical units away; some time after the supernova, several iron cells and alien debris fly directly from the destroyed sun and into the Solar System towards the Earth. After much chaos and the continual shower of iron cells, it was ruled out that the disaster was invasion related, resulting in the construction of a fleet of space fighter class called the Violent Soldier. The Violent Soldiers are sent to the source of the supernova whereupon they find the automated ruins of an advanced civilization led by an enormous, cybernetic iron-spewing alien monster.

TurboGrafix-16: A massive, planet-devouring, cybernetic entity named Sinistron approaches the Solar System. After devouring Pluto, a fleet of space fighters is sent to destroy it, but only one (the player's) survives.

Gameplay

The jaws of the player's spacecraft are adjustable. Opening the invincible jaws of the ship increases the spread of the player's shots but exposes the vulnerable cockpit. Obtaining one weapon upgrade allows the ship's jaws to be set half-way open (a 3-shot spread) or closed (with increased damage), and a second upgrade allows them to be closed, half open, or fully open (a 5-shot spread).

Five power-ups exist in the game. The Vulcan flame cannon, crystal-pulse laser, and CHAOS (homing) missiles are weapon upgrades. There are also speed upgrades and plasma droids, invincible pods which will flank the ship. The plasma droids can absorb enemy pellets and will even damage enemies they come into contact with.

The ship's charge-up attack releases a circular wave of force that will damage all enemies in a radius around the ship.

Sinistron has six stages of quickly increasing difficulty. The last two stages take place inside the Sinistron creature itself. The stages are:
Mechanical
Gas Tunnel
Biological
Deep Space
Organs
Cerebral Cortex

External links 
 Sinistron Strategy Guide and Sinistron Advertisement and Sinistron Review at TurboPlay Magazine Archives

1990 video games
Horizontally scrolling shooters
Information Global Service games
Science fiction video games
Single-player video games
TurboGrafx-16 games
TurboGrafx-16-only games
Video games about extraterrestrial life
Video games developed in Japan